Frank Buchanan (June 14, 1862 – April 18, 1930) was a Democratic member of the United States House of Representatives from Illinois.  He served in Congress for three terms from March 4, 1911, to March 3, 1917

Biography
Buchanan was born in Jefferson County, Indiana near the town of Madison on June 14, 1862. He was a farmer and later a bridge builder. In 1901 he became president of the International Structural Iron Worker's Union. He ran unsuccessfully for Congress in 1906 and 1908. In 1910 he was finally elected, and served three terms, before losing a reelection bid in 1916.

After losing he returned to his career as an iron worker. Buchanan died in Chicago, Illinois on April 18, 1930.

References

Further reading

External links
 

1862 births
1930 deaths
Democratic Party members of the United States House of Representatives from Illinois